The 1990 CONCACAF Under-20 Championship was held in Guatemala. It also served as qualification for the 1991 FIFA World Youth Championship.

Qualification

|}

Other qualification matches may have been played.

Teams
The following teams entered the tournament:

Round 1

Group 1

Group 2

Group 3

Group 4

Final round

Qualification to World Youth Championship
The two best performing teams qualified for the 1991 FIFA World Youth Championship.

External links
Results by CONCACAF
Results by RSSSF

CONCACAF Under-20 Championship
1990 in youth association football